James Ray Wyatt was an American car dealer and state legislator in Alabama. He served in the Alabama Senate and was a segregationist. He represented Alabama's Sixth Senatorial District.

Wyatt owned a Ford dealership in Pell City. He was involved in a land sale of property in northern St. Clair County, Alabama to Black Muslims that sparked controversy and protests. He was part of a lawsuit that sought to nullify the sale.

There is a Ray Wyatt Road in Ashville, Alabama in Saint Clair County.

References

Year of birth missing (living people)
Living people
20th-century American businesspeople
Businesspeople from Alabama
People from Pell City, Alabama
American automobile salespeople
Alabama state senators
20th-century American politicians